Tshilidzi Marwala  (born 28 July 1971) is a South African artificial intelligence engineer, a computer scientist, a mechanical engineer and a university administrator.

Early life and education 
Marwala was born at Duthuni Village in the Limpopo Province. He obtained a PhD in artificial intelligence from the University of Cambridge and Bachelor of Science in mechanical engineering from Case Western Reserve University, graduating with a Magna Cum Laude.  He attended school at Mbilwi Secondary School and St.John's College in Johannesburg.

Career
Marwala is the Rector of the United Nations University and UN Under-Secretary-General. Marwala was previously a vice-chancellor and principal of the University of Johannesburg. He was previously the deputy vice chancellor for research and internationalization as well as the dean of engineering at the University of Johannesburg and a professor of electrical engineering at the University of the Witwatersrand. He was a post-doctoral fellow at Imperial College of Science, Technology and Medicine. He served as a trustee of the Nelson Mandela Foundation and on a board of Nedbank.

One of the books he co-authored on modelling interstate conflict has been translated into Chinese by the National Defense Industry Press.  His work and opinion have appeared in media such as New Scientist, Time, The Economist, CNN, and BBC. He has also given talks at Rhodes House, Royal Society, Cambridge Union, Harvard's Berkman Klein Center for Internet & Society and Oxford Union. In 2016 Tshilidzi Marwala delivered the Bernard Price Memorial Lecture in South Africa. With Stephen Hawking and Guy Laliberté he was a judge of the YouTube Space Lab competition.

Academic contributions and research
Marwala's research interests include the theory and application of artificial intelligence to engineering, computer science, finance, economics, social science and medicine. He has made fundamental contributions to engineering science including the development of the concept of pseudo-modal energies, proposing the theory of rational counterfactual thinking, rational opportunity cost and the theory of flexibly bounded rationality. He was a co-inventor of the innovative methods of radiation imaging and with Megan Jill Russell as well as David Rubin the artificial larynx. Marwala also observed that the applicability of prospect theory depends on how much artificial intelligence is used to make a decision. He also observed that the more artificial intelligence is used for decision making the more efficient the markets become. For example, if all decisions are made by artificially intelligent machines then the markets will be fully rational. Marwala together with Israeli researcher Daniel Muller mathematically solved the St. Peterburg paradox through the use of the concept of the relative net utility.
 
Marwala together with Evan Hurwitz proposed that there is less level of information asymmetry between two artificial intelligent agents than between two human agents and that the more artificial intelligence there is in the market the less is the volume of trades in the market. With Evan Hurwitz, Marwala was the first researcher to build software agents that are able to bluff on playing a game of poker. Tshilidzi Marwala and Evan Hurwitz in their book applied Lewis turning point theory to study the transition of the economy into automated production and identified an equilibrium point (Lewis turning point) where it does not make economic sense to move human labor to automated machines.

Tshilidzi Marwala and Evan Hurwitz in their book observed that the advent of intelligent online buying platforms such as Amazon and technologies such as flexible manufacturing offers the opportunity for individualized supply and demand curves to be produced. They observed that these reduce the degree of arbitrage in the market, permit for individualized pricing for the same product and brings fairness and efficiency into the market. Furthermore, with Evan Hurwitz in their book they observed that decision making and predicting machines that are executed using artificial intelligence and other machine learning techniques reduce the biases and variances of the errors on decision making and thus make decisions in a closer manner to the conclusions of rational expectations theory than human decision makers. Marwala and Bo Xing have also studied the relationship between blockchain and artificial intelligence. In his response to Bill Gates, Marwala has also brought to the attention of the difficulty of taxing robots given the fact that a great deal of the devices that we use have robotics features.

Vice-Chancellor of the University of Johannesburg

Fourth Industrial Revolution
As Vice-Chancellor, Marwala positioned the University of Johannesburg to drive the fourth industrial revolution (4IR) in South Africa to accelerate the United Nations' Sustainable Development Goals (SGDs). To drive the fourth industrial revolution, Marwala introduced a compulsory course on artificial intelligence as well as an Africa Insights course for all students irrespective of their majors. Furthermore, he introduced Africa by Bus Project, where thousands of students travel by bus to various African countries to understand the African continent.

Rankings
Under his leadership, the University of Johannesburg was ranked first in Africa in the 2021 Times Higher Education (THE) University Impact Rankings on Sustainable Development Goals, 1st position globally for Decent Work and Economic Growth (SDG 8). In the 2022 Times Higher Education Impact Ranking, it was ranked second in Africa and first in South Africa. From 2018 to 2022, the University of Johannesburg increased research output from position 6 to position 2 in South Africa. Furthermore, according to the Quacquarelli Symonds (QS) ranking, UJ increased from being number 5 in Africa in 2021 (announced in 2020) to number 2 in Africa in 2023 (announced in 2022).

Fundraising
Marwala is a formidable fundraiser, and under his leadership, the University of Johannesburg increased its endowment from US$61 million to US$200 million from 2018 to 2022. During his tenure, the University of Johannesburg purchased and financed two additional campuses, Devland Campus (US$10million) and Media 24 Park (US$20 million), and completed the Soweto Residence Complex (US$30million). Furthermore, the University of Johannesburg increased electricity consumption from solar energy from 0% to 15% from 2018 to 2022.

Institutes
Marwala was the brainchild of the establishment of the Johannesburg Institute for Advanced Study, UJ Press, Johannesburg Business School, Institute of Future Studies, with University of West Indies the  Institute for Global African Affairs and Institute of Intelligent Systems.

Governments and United Nations
Marwala has served globally and nationally on policymaking bodies. Most recently, he was the Deputy Chair of South Africa’s Presidential Commission on the Fourth Industrial Revolution (with the President of South Africa Cyril Ramaphosa serving as Chair). This committee developed the country’s fourth industrial revolution strategy. Continentally, Marwala is the Chair of the International Scientific Advisory Board for the African Centre of Excellence in the Internet of Things (ACE-IoT) based in Rwanda. Globally, he was a member of the World Health Organization (WHO) committee that developed the ethical guidelines of using artificial intelligence in medicine. Furthermore, he was a member of the committee that developed the international accord on open data for the International Council for Science (ICSU) in Paris. He was appointed by the government of Namibia on the Fourth Industrial Revolution Task Team. Marwala has also worked with the United Nations through agencies such as UNESCO, UNIDO, WHO, ITU, ILO, UNICEF, and WIPO.

Other Activities

Corporate Boards
Nedbank (2019-2023)

Non-Profits
Trustee of the Nelson Mandela Foundation (2020-2023)

Visiting appointments
Marwala has been a visiting fellow at Harvard University, Wolfson College, Cambridge, and University of California, Berkeley He is an honorary professor at the Nanjing Tech University as well as the Central South University in The People's Republic of China.

Awards and honors 
Marwala is a member of the American Academy of Arts and Sciences, TWAS, and the African Academy of Sciences.  In high school he won the National Youth Science Olympiad and represented South Africa in the London International Youth Science Forum. He is the recipient of the Order of Mapungubwe. In 2022, Marwala was awarded the IT Personality of the Year Award in South Africa for his work on the fourth industrial revolution. Marwala has received honorary doctorates from the Caucasus University in Tbilisi in Georgia and the University of Venda.

Books

Patents 
 D.M. Starfield, D.M. Rubin and T. Marwala. United States Patent: 20080296504 “Method and Apparatus for Radiation Imaging”.https://patents.google.com/patent/US20120106699
 D.M. Starfield, D.M. Rubin and T. Marwala. United States Patent: 20110190616A1 “Coded Aperture Masks for Radiation-Based Medical Imaging”. https://patents.google.com/patent/US20110190616A1/en
 M.J. Russell, D.M. Rubin, B. Wigdorowitz and T. Marwala. United States Patent: 9129595B2 “An Artificial Larynx”. https://patents.google.com/patent/US9129595B2/en?inventor=marwala&oq=marwala
 Dipanjan Paul Tshilidzi Marwala, and Satyakama Paul. (WO2019224739A1) System and method for real-time prediction of water level and hazard level of a dam. https://patents.google.com/patent/WO2019224739A1/en
 Tshilidzi Marwala, Rendani Mbuvha. United States Patent: 20210350928. A system and method for imputing missing data in a dataset, a method and system for determining a health condition of a person, and a method and system of calculating an insurance premium. https://patents.justia.com/patent/20210350928

Publications
 
 
 D. Lunga, T. Marwala. Online forecasting of stock market movement direction using the improved incremental algorithm. Lecture Notes in Computer Science, In Neural Information Processing, Springer Berlin / Heidelberg, Volume 4234, 2006, pp. 440–449.
 
 .

References

External links
Biography

1971 births
Living people

 
 
People from Thulamela Local Municipality
Alumni of St John's College, Cambridge
Case Western Reserve University alumni
University of Pretoria alumni
Inventors
Alumni of St John's College (Johannesburg)
Vice-Chancellors of University of Johannesburg
South African engineers
South African inventors
Computer
South African computer scientists
21st-century inventors
Fellows of the African Academy of Sciences